Florentina Bunea  is a Romanian-American statistician, interested in machine learning, the theory of empirical processes, and high-dimensional statistics. She is a professor at Cornell University.

Education and Career
Bunea earned Bachelor's and Master's degrees at the University of Bucharest in 1989 and 1991. After working as an assistant professor at the Politehnica University of Bucharest from 1991 to 1995, she returned to graduate study at the University of Washington. She earned her Ph.D. there in 2000; her dissertation, A Model Selection Approach to Partially Linear Regression, was supervised by Jon A. Wellner.

She joined the statistics faculty at Florida State University in 2000, and moved to Cornell University in 2011. At Cornell, she is a faculty member in the Department of Statistics and Data Science, a member of the Center for Applied Mathematics and the Machine Learning Group in Cornell Computing and Information Science (CIS).

Recognition
In 2017, Bunea was elected as a Fellow of the Institute of Mathematical Statistics.

References

External links
Home page

1966 births
Living people
American statisticians
Romanian statisticians
Women statisticians
University of Bucharest alumni
University of Washington alumni
Academic staff of the Politehnica University of Bucharest
Cornell University faculty
Fellows of the Institute of Mathematical Statistics